Tevfik Haccar Taşçı (1890 Kadıköy, Istanbul  – Istanbul 1979) was a Turkish footballer, who was among the first squads of Fenerbahçe. He was the third president of the major Turkish multi-sport club Fenerbahçe SK between 1909-10. He also introduced the sport of tennis to the club.

References

1890 births
1979 deaths
Turkish footballers
Fenerbahçe S.K. footballers

Association footballers not categorized by position
People from Kadıköy
Footballers from Istanbul